Tavaris Barnes Sr. (born November 2, 1991) is a former American football defensive end. He played college football at Clemson, and signed with the New Orleans Saints as an undrafted free agent in 2015.

Professional career

New Orleans Saints
On May 2, 2015, Barnes signed with the New Orleans Saints as an undrafted free agent. On September 5, Barnes made the New Orleans Saints 53-man roster. On April 25, 2016, he was waived.

Seattle Seahawks
On April 28, 2016, the Seattle Seahawks signed Barnes to their roster. On August 9, he was waived.

Tampa Bay Buccaneers
On May 31, 2017, Barnes was signed by the Tampa Bay Buccaneers. He was waived on September 2, 2017.

Washington Redskins
On November 8, 2017, Barnes was signed to the Washington Redskins' practice squad. He was released on November 14, 2017. He was re-signed on December 19, 2017. He signed a reserve/future contract with the Redskins on January 1, 2018, but was waived on August 7, 2018.

Atlanta Legends
In late 2018, Barnes joined the Atlanta Legends of the Alliance of American Football. The league ceased operations in April 2019.

DC Defenders
Barnes was drafted by the DC Defenders in the open phase of the 2020 XFL Draft. He had his contract terminated when the league suspended operations on April 10, 2020.

Calgary Stampeders
Barnes signed with the Calgary Stampeders of the CFL on January 27, 2021. He retired from football on June 28, 2021.

Statistics
Source: NFL.com

References

External links
Seattle Seahawks bio
New Orleans Saints bio
Clemson Tigers bio

1991 births
Living people
Players of American football from Jacksonville, Florida
American football defensive ends
Clemson Tigers football players
New Orleans Saints players
Seattle Seahawks players
Tampa Bay Buccaneers players
Washington Redskins players
Atlanta Legends players
DC Defenders players
Calgary Stampeders players